José do Telhado is a 1945 Portuguese historical adventure film directed by Armando de Miranda and starring Virgilio Teixeira, Adelina Campos and Juvenal de Araújo. It portrays the life of the nineteenth century bandit José do Telhado. A previous silent film José do Telhado had been released in 1929.

Cast
 Virgilio Teixeira as José do Telhado  
 Adelina Campos as Aninhas, José's wife 
 Juvenal de Araújo as José Pequeno / Little Joseph  
 Patrício Álvares as Boca Negra / Black-Mouth  
 Fernando Silva as Gangster  
 Flor de Almeida as Gangster 
 Manuela Bonito as Baroness  
 Jorge Grave as Administrative officer  
 Anna Paula

References

Bibliography
 Luís de Pina. A Aventura do cinema portuguęs. Vega, 1977.

External links 

1945 films
1940s historical adventure films
Portuguese historical adventure films
1940s Portuguese-language films
Films directed by Armando de Miranda
Films set in Angola
Films set in the 19th century
Portuguese black-and-white films